Matthew Gordon Bullard (born June 5, 1967) is an American former professional basketball player in the NBA and former color analyst for the Houston Rockets on AT&T SportsNet Southwest. Bullard played 12 years professionally and 11 years in the NBA, most notably with the Houston Rockets from 1990 to 1994, and then again from 1996 to 2001. Other teams he played for include the Atlanta Hawks, Charlotte Hornets, and PAOK in Greece.

Early life
Matt Bullard went to Valley High School in West Des Moines, Iowa. He went undrafted after graduating from the University of Iowa in 1990.

Professional career
Bullard played nine seasons with the Houston Rockets (1990–94, 1996–2001) and one season each with both the Atlanta Hawks (1995–96) and the Charlotte Hornets (2001–02). He also played in the 1994–95 season for the Greek League power PAOK. He has career averages of 5.3 points and two rebounds per game. He was known affectionately in Houston as "Air Bullard" in part for his ability to get extreme height on his three-point shots (due to his height at 2.08 m, 6 ft 10 in) and partly as good-natured ribbing about his poor vertical jump, but Bullard was also a fan favorite and an essential part to Houston's first championship in 1994.

Post–basketball life
In 2004, Bullard lost to Dee Brown on the ESPN reality television program Dream Job in the finals as they competed for a coveted sports analyst position on the sports network. When asked about losing to Dee Brown, Bullard remarked "at least it wasn't Pete Chilcutt". He and Clyde Drexler shared color commentating duties for local Houston Rockets game telecasts alongside long-time play-by-play man Bill Worrell. On June 2, 2021, Bullard announced that his tenure with AT&T SportsNet Southwest was done and he would not be part of its broadcast lineup for the 2021-22 NBA season.

Career statistics

NBA

Source

Regular season

|-
| align="left"  | 
| align="left" | Houston
| 18 || 0 || 3.5 || .452 || .000 || .647 || .8 || .1 || .2 || .0 || 2.2
|-
| align="left" | 
| align="left" | Houston
| 80 || 7 || 16.0 || .459 || .386 || .760 || 2.8 || .9 || .3 || .3 || 6.4
|-
| align="left" | 
| align="left" | Houston
| 79 || 4 || 17.2 || .431 || .374 || .784 || 2.8 || 1.4 || .4 || .1 || 7.3
|-
|style="text-align:left;background:#afe6ba;"| †
| align="left" | Houston
| 65 || 0 || 11.2 || .345 || .325 || .769 || 1.3 || 1.0 || .2 || .1 || 3.5
|-
| align="left" | 
| align="left" | Atlanta
| 46 || 0 || 10.0 || .407 || .361 || .800 || 1.3 || .4 || .4 || .2 || 3.8
|-
| align="left" | 
| align="left" | Houston
| 71 || 12 || 14.4 || .401 || .366 || .735 || 1.6 || .9 || .3 || .3 || 4.5
|-
| align="left" | 
| align="left" | Houston
| 67 || 24 || 17.8 || .450 || .416 || .741 || 2.2 || .9 || .5 || .4 || 7.0
|-
| align="left" | 
| align="left" | Houston
| 41 || 0 || 10.1 || .377 || .387 || .700 || 1.0 || .4 || .3 || .1 || 2.9
|-
| align="left" | 
| align="left" | Houston
| 56 || 27 || 18.3 || .409 || .446 || .833 || 2.5 || 1.1 || .3 || .2 || 6.8
|-
| align="left" | 
| align="left" | Houston
| 61 || 5 || 16.4 || .423 || .404 || .714 || 2.1 || .7 || .2 || .1 || 5.8
|-
| align="left" | 
| align="left" | Charlotte
| 31 || 0 || 11.3 || .339 || .281 || .917 || 1.5 || .5 || .1 || .1 || 3.4
|- class="sortbottom"
| style="text-align:center;" colspan="2"| Career
| 615 || 79 || 14.4 || .418 || .384 || .768 || 2.0 || .9 || .3 || .2 || 5.3

Playoffs

|-
| align="left" | 1993
| align="left" | Houston
| 12 || 0 || 14.1 || .476 || .536 || 1.000 || 1.9 || 1.1 || .3 || .4 || 5.1
|-
|style="text-align:left;background:#afe6ba;" | 1994†
| align="left" | Houston
| 10 || 0 || 5.5 || .214 || .200 || .750 || 1.0 || .0 || .1 || .2 || 1.6
|-
| align="left" | 1996
| align="left" | Atlanta
| 4 || 0 || 12.8 || .333 || .500 || .500 || 1.5 || .0 || .0 || .5 || 3.5
|-
| align="left" | 1997
| align="left" | Houston
| 2 || 0 || 3.5 || 1.000 || 1.000 || – || 1.0 || .0 || .0 || .0 || 3.0
|-
| align="left" | 1998
| align="left" | Houston
| 5 || 4 || 14.0 || .333 || .300 || 1.000 || 1.6 || 1.0 || .2 || .0 || 3.4
|-
| align="left" | 1999
| align="left" | Houston
| 2 || 0 || 4.0 || 1.000 || 1.000 || 1.000 || .0 || .5 || .0 || .0 || 3.5
|- class="sortbottom"
| style="text-align:center;" colspan="2"| Career
| 35 || 4 || 10.3 || .400 || .458 || .818 || 1.4 || .5 || .2 || .3 || 3.5

References

External links
Matt Bullard - Hawkeye Sports News
NBA.com player profile
Matt Bullard  at the Houston Rockets Fan Site
Matt Bullard Basketball Camp

1967 births
Living people
American expatriate basketball people in Greece
American men's basketball players
Atlanta Hawks players
Basketball players from Des Moines, Iowa
Charlotte Hornets players
Colorado Buffaloes men's basketball players
Greek Basket League players
Houston Rockets players
Iowa Hawkeyes men's basketball players
P.A.O.K. BC players
Participants in American reality television series
Undrafted National Basketball Association players
United States men's national basketball team players
Universiade medalists in basketball
Universiade gold medalists for the United States
Universiade silver medalists for the United States
Forwards (basketball)
Medalists at the 1987 Summer Universiade
Medalists at the 1989 Summer Universiade